Saleh Bay  (Indonesian: Teluk Saleh) is the largest bay in the island of Sumbawa, Indonesia, roughly on the north central part.  It is semi enclosed by Moyo Island and the peninsula of Tambora, Sanggar Peninsula.   3 larger islands in the bay are Liang Island, Ngali Island, and Rakit Island.  3 of the 4 regencies of Sumbawa border the bay.

Further reading
 Egon T. Degens and Beate Buch (1989) Sedimentological events in Saleh Bay, off Mount Tambora Netherlands Journal of Sea Research (December 1989), 24 (4), pg. 399-404

Bays of Indonesia
Landforms of Sumbawa
Landforms of West Nusa Tenggara